Hesar-e Bala (also Romanized as Ḩeşār-e Bālā and Ḩeşār Bālā) is a village in Behnamarab-e Jonubi Rural District, Javadabad District, Varamin County, Tehran Province, Iran. At the 2006 census, its population was 657, in 147 families.

References 

Populated places in Varamin County